Hutchinsonia glabrescens is a species of flowering plant in the family Rubiaceae, commonly known as the coffee family. It is found in Liberia.

External links 
 World Checklist of Rubiaceae

Vanguerieae
Flora of Liberia